The 830 class are a class of diesel locomotives built by AE Goodwin, Auburn for the South Australian Railways between 1959 and 1966. The New South Wales 48 class and Silverton Rail 48s class are of a very similar design.

History
In 1959, the South Australian Railways placed an order for 10 Alco DL531 locomotives for use in light freight haulage, especially on branch lines where a low axle load was essential. Further orders saw the fleet built up to 44 by February 1970 with 15 narrow gauge, 12 standard gauge and 17 broad gauge examples. In February 1970, an additional unit was purchased second hand from Silverton Tramway.

In March 1978, 43 were included in the transfer of the South Australian Railways to Australian National with the other two (no. 830 & 845) going to the State Transport Authority before also moving to Australian National. From July 1974 until December 1980 847–849, were loaned to the Public Transport Commission where they were pooled with the 48 class.

Following the conversion of the Adelaide to Alice Springs in the early 1980s and the release of some Commonwealth Railways NJ class locomotives, beginning in April 1980, some 830s were transferred to Australian National's TasRail operation with 20 transferred by August 1986. Withdrawals of the TasRail fleet commenced in late 1987 with only three in service by April 1989. Australian National transferred five back to South Australia while two were sold to Silverton Rail and shipped to Broken Hill. One was preserved by the Don River Railway, Devonport. The remainder were scrapped.

In 1991, six were rebuilt as the DA class with new cabs to allow them to be used as shunters. In December 1994 two 48 class locomotives were purchased from the State Rail Authority. One was rebuilt as DA7 and the other scrapped.

Australian National's remaining 830 class were all included with the sale of the South Australian freight operations to Australian Southern Railroad in August 1997.

In June 2000, three were sold to ATN Access for use on grain services. All were included in the sale of the business to Pacific National in February 2004, ending up in storage during the first few years of ownership under PN. 833 was scrapped in July 2016, while 845 was given to SteamRanger Heritage Railway, arriving at their Mt Barker depot in July 2017.  838 remains stored in Junee, still wearing primer paint from its never completed overhaul. 

When Australian Railroad Group was dissolved, 852 passed to QR National, while the other 830s went to Genesee and Wyoming Australia. 852 was sold to Junee Railway Workshop in 2008 and after being overhauled returned to service in 2012. As of 2023, the only ex-GWA 830 class in service is narrow gauge locomotive 851, which hauls the Thevenard gypsum train on the Eyre Peninsula Railway. The rest have been donated to preservation societies, stored, or scrapped.

Status table

References

External links

A. E. Goodwin locomotives
Co-Co locomotives
Railway locomotives introduced in 1959
830
Standard gauge locomotives of Australia
3 ft 6 in gauge locomotives of Australia
Broad gauge locomotives in Australia
5 ft 3 in gauge locomotives
Diesel-electric locomotives of Australia